James Henthorne Argue (2 June 1848 – 4 March 1927) was a politician in Manitoba, Canada.  He served in the Legislative Assembly of Manitoba from 1899 to 1914, as a member of the Conservative Party.

Argue was born in Ireland, and received a grammar school education.  He worked as a farmer after moving in Manitoba, and served for fifteen years as a local reeve and councillor.  In religion, he was a member of the Church of England.

He was first elected to the Manitoba legislature in the 1899 provincial election, defeating Liberal incumbent Thomas Dickey by seventy-seven votes in the Avondale constituency.
The Conservatives won this election, and Argue served in the legislature as a government backbencher.  He was re-elected in the campaigns of 1903,
1907 and 1910, and did not seek re-election in 1914.

He later moved to Vancouver, where he died in 1927.

His son, James O. Argue, was a Progressive Conservative member of the legislature from 1945 to 1955.

References

1848 births
1927 deaths
Progressive Conservative Party of Manitoba MLAs